Sir Sri Rama Varma XV  (1852–1932), known as the  Rajarshi of Cochin and as Abdicated Highness, was the ruler of the Kingdom of Cochin from 1895 to 1914.

Reign

Rama Varma was appointed a Knight Commander of the Order of the Star of India (KCSI). In January 1903 he attended the Delhi Durbar to commemorate the accession to the throne of King Edward VII, and he received the Delhi Durbar Medal. In the accompanying 1903 Durbar Honours he was promoted to a Knight Grand Commander of the Order of the Star of India (GCSI).

Rama Varma abdicated the throne in 1914. He died in January 1932 at his summer residence in Thrissur. He was cremated with full state honours in the premises of his home. Both his palace and resting place are now situated in the premises of Sree Kerala Varma College, made by and named after Kerala Varma VII. His name was given to several educational institutions in the Cochin state like the one in Vadavucode named Rajarshi Memorial Higher Secondary school Vadavucode and Rajarshi Memorial Higher Secondary school, Alloor.

Personal life 
Rama Varma XV had married twice, his first marriage did not last for long due to the death of his wife. His second wife was Ittyanath Madathil Parukutty a member of the Ittyanath Family from Villadam, Thrissur. Parukutty was his Nethyaramma there after. He also happens to be the step father of Ittyanath Madathil Madhavi (wife of Rama Varma Parikshith Thampuran).

Parukutty was a widow herself before her marriage to Rama Varma XV and had a girl child from that marriage. As it's a custom then to leave children from earlier marriage at one's ancestral home Parukutty did the same after her marriage to Rama Varma XV. Upon her arrival at the Palace in Tripunithura, Rama Varma XV enquired about the child. When he heard about the child from Parukutty, he ordered that the child should be brought to the Palace at once. Later this child was destined to become a Nethyaramma herself after her marriage to Rama Varma Parikshith Thampuran.

References 

 

1932 deaths
1852 births
Indian knights
19th-century Indian monarchs
Knights Grand Commander of the Order of the Star of India
Knights Grand Commander of the Order of the Indian Empire
Rulers of Cochin
Monarchs who abdicated
20th-century Indian monarchs
Indian Sanskrit scholars
19th-century Indian educational theorists
20th-century Indian educational theorists
Scholars from Kerala